The 1879 Rutgers Queensmen football team represented Rutgers University in the 1879 college football season. The Queensmen compiled a 1–2–3 record and were outscored by their opponents 11 to 5. The team had no coach, and its captains were N. W. Voorhees and C. I. Haring.

Schedule

References

Rutgers
Rutgers Scarlet Knights football seasons
Rutgers Queensmen football